The Headwater Diversion Channel is a canal in southeast Missouri. Flowing west to east, it diverts the headwaters of the Castor and Whitewater rivers and Crooked Creek directly into the Mississippi River south of Cape Girardeau. It was built between 1910 and 1916 by the Little River Drainage District. The streams diverted by the Headwater Diversion Channel formerly flowed into the Little River, and their portions that are downstream of the Diversion Channel still do so.

The Headwater Diversion Channel played an important part in the drainage of Missouri's Bootheel region, converting it into rich agricultural land.

References

External links
 History of Little River Drainage District, http://www.sos.mo.gov/archives/mdh_splash/default.asp?coll=lilrivdd

Canals in Missouri
Buildings and structures in Bollinger County, Missouri
Buildings and structures in Cape Girardeau County, Missouri
Canals opened in 1916